Sarah Bond Hanley (January 1865 – April 15, 1959) was an American politician most notable for being one of the first two Democratic women to serve in the Illinois General Assembly.

Biography
She was born in Leon, Iowa in 1865. She attended Monmouth College in Monmouth, Illinois. In 1889, she married attorney John Hanley with whom she would have one daughter, Helen. 

Hanley was a member of the first Democratic Women's Club in the country, organized in 1888. During the 1892 election, Hanley, as an officer of the club, made the first monetary campaign contribution from a women's club to a political campaign. She served on the woman's auxiliary of the Democratic Party of Illinois. She campaigned for both Woodrow Wilson and James M. Cox. In 1921, she became the first woman to participate in a judicial convention. She was a member of the Illinois delegation to the 1924 Democratic National Convention. 

In 1926, she and Mary C. McAdams of Quincy, Illinois became the first two Democratic women elected to the Illinois General Assembly. She served two terms, leaving the House in 1931. 

In addition to her involvement in the Democratic Party, she was also active as a high-ranking member of the Daughters of the American Revolution. She died April 15, 1959 in Springfield, Illinois at age 94.

References

1865 births
Date of birth missing
1959 deaths
19th-century American politicians
20th-century American politicians
Democratic Party members of the Illinois House of Representatives
Monmouth College alumni
People from Leon, Iowa
People from Monmouth, Illinois
Women state legislators in Illinois
19th-century American women politicians
20th-century American women politicians